Peter Levens (1552-1587) was an English lexicographer. He was born in Yorkshire, and attended Magdalen College. He received his bachelor's and master's degrees from Oxford University.

He was a contemporary of John Withals, Richard Huloet, and John Veron. He is most famous for being the author of the Manipulus Vocabulorum.

References

External links
 
 
 

British writers
British lexicographers
1552 births
1587 deaths